CPSL may refer to:

Cambridge Programme for Sustainability Leadership, an executive education department within the University of Cambridge
Canadian Soccer League, formerly the Canadian Professional Soccer League (CPSL)
Canadian Professional Soccer League (1983), a semi-professional soccer league of 1983
Communist Party of Sri Lanka, a political party in Sri Lanka